Rowland Lee or Leigh may refer to:
Rowland Lee (bishop) (c. 1487–1543), English bishop
Rowland Leigh (MP) (died 1603), English Member of Parliament for Cricklade, 1584
Rowland V. Lee (1891–1975), American film director
Rowland Leigh (1902–1963), English-American screenwriter
Rowland Lee (composer) (born 1960), British composer

See also
Roland Lee (born 1964), English swimmer